Big Blues is an album by American flugelhornist Art Farmer and guitarist Jim Hall featuring performances recorded in 1978 and released on the CTI label.

Reception
The Allmusic review stated "Since Farmer and Hall have long had very complementary styles (both being lyrical, harmonically advanced and thoughtful in their improvisations), it is little surprise that this set is a complete success".

Track listing
 "Whisper Not" (Benny Golson) - 8:44 
 "A Child Is Born" (Thad Jones) - 7:40 
 "Big Blues" (Jim Hall) - 7:23 
 "Pavane for a Dead Princess" (Maurice Ravel) - 10:50

Personnel
Art Farmer - flugelhorn
Jim Hall - guitar
Michael Moore - bass
Steve Gadd - drums 
Mike Mainieri - vibraphone
David Matthews - arranger

References 

1979 albums
Art Farmer albums
Jim Hall (musician) albums
Albums produced by Creed Taylor
Albums arranged by David Matthews (keyboardist)
Albums recorded at Electric Lady Studios
CTI Records albums